Reuben Frank Bernard (1834 – November 17, 1903) was an American Brigadier General.

Early life 
Bernard was born in rural Hawkins County, Tennessee to John Bernard Sr. and Mary Morelock Bernard. He was the eldest boy of 14 brothers and sisters, two of whom died as infants. His sister, Annie, was three years his senior. Three of his brothers died fighting in the American Civil War. Reuben is said to have impulsively deserted his family farm at age 22, going to Knoxville, Tennessee and becoming a blacksmith's apprentice.

Career
Bernard enlisted in the first formal US cavalry unit in 1855, and fought for the Union during the American Civil War.

His expedition arrested the Apache war chief Cochise, who was accused of kidnapping children, in 1861. Bernard was arrested and tried for insubordination after a quarrel with a lieutenant named Bascom, but was released. He served in New Mexico and later in the eastern theatre. He went west in 1869 and led eight expeditions against the Apache, killing 30 in the Battle of Chiricahua Pass. In 1872, he was transferred to the Pacific Northwest to fight in the American Indian Wars, specifically against the Modoc tribe.

At the First Battle of the Stronghold, he tried to capture Kintpuash (Captain Jack)'s stronghold but was forced to retreat.

References 

 Quarterly Journal of Military History

Union Army generals
1903 deaths
1834 births